Russia recognizes neither same-sex marriage nor any other form of civil union for same-sex couples. Since 2020, the Russian Constitution explicitly outlaws same-sex marriage. Earlier Russian laws stipulate several provisions which prevent the recognition of legal foreign marriages in Russia and a marriage entered into by two persons of the same sex is not one of them. In the 2021 case Fedotova and Others v. Russia, the European Court of Human Rights ruled that it was a violation of human rights for Russia not to offer any form of legal recognition to same-sex relationships.

Position of the Russian Orthodox Church

In 2016, Patriarch Kirill of Moscow stated that same-sex marriage is a form of "Soviet totalitarianism". In May 2017, he likened it to Nazism and referred it as threat to family values during a visit to Kyrgyzstan.

Same-sex marriage campaign in Russia

In April 2009, Nikolay Alexeyev launched a campaign for same sex marriage in Russia. He had previously stated in 2005 and again in 2008 that his LGBT Human Rights Project Gayrussia.ru is ready to help a genuine gay or lesbian couples who want to get its family and marriage rights respected in Russia.

On May 12, 2009, a lesbian couple, Irina Fedotova (Fet) and Irina Shipitko applied for marriage at the Tverskoy Office for the Registration of Civil Acts (ZAGS) in the centre of Moscow. The couple's appeal to the Court said: "The Russian Constitution and family laws do not prohibit same-sex marriages." The lesbian couple declared to The New York Times: "We have love, we have happiness, we want to be together for our whole lives and we want to do this here in Russia."

It was done during the upcoming Slavic Pride and also upcoming Eurovision Song Contest 2009, both scheduled on May 16 in Moscow. The 2009 edition of Moscow Pride, renamed as Slavic Pride, took place under the motto "Gay equality - no compromise", postulating the right to adopt children and same-sex marriage. The location of the protest was changed at the last moment to the Vorobyovy Gory viewpoint near Moscow State University, a popular spot for wedding photographs. This location underlined the motto of the protest. The couple received a written denial from Svetlana Potamyshneva, head of the office, who denied to register the marriage stating that “Point 3 of Article 1 of the Family Code of Russia stipulates that the regulation of family relations must adhere to the principle of a voluntary union between a man and a woman”. In June 2009, the couple appealed to the Tverskoy District Court against the written denial they received from the Marriage office. Their claim stated: "The Russian Constitution and family laws do not prohibit same-sex marriages. In addition, family and marriage rights, including those same-sex, are guaranteed with Articles 8 and 12 of the European Human Rights Convention ratified by the Russian Federation". The Court hearing scheduled on August 26, 2009 was postponed to September 9, 2009 and later, October 6, 2009. The Court upheld the decision of the Tverskoy ZAGS and rejected the arguments of the couple. Nikolay Alexeyev told journalists that the case will be appealed up to Supreme Court and to the European Court of Human Rights. Caroline Mecary, a French lawyer who defended a French gay couple in a similar case at the European Court, said in June 2009 that she will take the case of the Russian couple to Strasbourg. Nikolay Alexeyev, who acted as the lawyer of the lesbian couple, told the journalist that his organization will help the couple to legally register their marriage in Canada in October 2009 and later seek its legal recognition in Russia.

The couple has announced their intent to marry in Toronto, Canada on 23 October 2009, where same-sex marriage is opened for non-residents and later pursue legal recognition of their union from the Russian government. 

The couple entered into same-sex marriage as planned on October 23. The ceremony was celebrated by first Canadian openly gay Judge Harvey Brownstone. Numerous media and local activists were present at the ceremony during which Irina Fedotova-Fet and Irina Shipitko exchanged vows. The newly wed couple received their marriage certificate which they intend to use upon their return to Russia to have their Canadian marriage also recognized in their home country. While the Family Code limits marriage to opposite-sex couples in Russia, there is a loophole in terms of the recognition of foreign marriages, where the basis of gender is not specified. The couple together with their lawyer Nikolay Alexeyev as well as local activists hosted a press conference at the Toronto City Hall before the ceremony during which Canadian gay activists spoke about their struggle for same-sex marriage, stressing the importance of supporting similar movements in other countries, including Russia.

On 21 January 2010, the Moscow City Court upheld the decision of the Tverskoy District Court of 6 October 2009. In July 2010 Irina Fedotova (Fet) and Irina Shipitko launched their complaint against Russia at the European Court of Human Rights.  In 2021, the European Court of Human Rights ruled in Fedotova and Others v. Russia that it was a violation of human rights for Russia not to offer any form of legal recognition to same-sex relationships.

Lack of recognition
The 2020 Russian constitutional referendum officially enshrined exclusively heterosexual marriage in the Russian Constitution.

Polling

The Institute for Comparative Social Research, which was conducted from 1 July 2015 to 31 July 2015, found that 5% of Russians favor or strongly favor allowing gays and lesbians to marry legally, with 3% among Russians aged 35+ years old, 5% among Orthodox, 8% among religious "nones", and 9% aged 18-34 years old.

See also
 Gayrussia.ru
 LGBT rights in Russia
 LGBT culture in Russia
 Moscow Pride
 Nikolay Alexeyev
 Recognition of same-sex unions in Asia
 Recognition of same-sex unions in Europe

References

External links

   Same-Sex Marriages Inside the Closet: Deconstruction of Gay and Lesbian Discourses in Russia
 French Wikipedia about Caroline Mecary

LGBT rights in Russia
Russia
Russia
Sexism in Russia